Rentier may refer to:

 Rentier capitalism, economic practices of gaining profit by monopolizing access to property
 Rentier state, a state which derives national revenues from the rent of indigenous resources
 Operation Rentier, a German military operation in Finland in World War II

See also
 Rent (disambiguation)